Jan Arnald (born 11 January 1963) is a Swedish novelist and literary critic, whose pen name is Arne Dahl. He has become famous with crime fiction, and he is also a regular writer in Swedish newspaper Dagens Nyheter.

He published Barbarer (2001) and Maria och Artur (2006) under his own name, but under his pen name he has written a series of crime novels about a fictional group of Swedish crime investigators, called "A Gruppen" in Swedish and "the Intercrime Group" in the first English translation. The books are translated into several languages. The first five books were made into 180-minute films, screened as two 90-minute episodes per story. The first, Misterioso, was screened on SVT1 in Sweden on 27 and 28 December 2011, with the following four stories shown in eight weekly instalments between October and December 2012. The series was picked up by BBC Four and screened on British television on Saturday nights as part of BBC Four's foreign crime series season starting in April 2013.

Works written

As Jan Arnald
Chiosmassakern (novel, 1990)
Nalkanden (poetry collection, 1992)
Genrernas tyranni (thesis, 1995)
3 variationer (prose, 1996)
Klä i ord (stories, 1997)
Barbarer (novel, 2001)
Maria och Artur (novel, 2006)
Intimus (novel, 2010)

As Arne Dahl

Intercrime series
Misterioso (1999); English translation by Tiina Nunnally: Misterioso, (2010 - US title)/The Blinded Man (2012 - UK title)
Ont blod (1998); Bad Blood (2013 - UK title)
Upp till toppen av berget (2000); To the Top of the Mountain(2014 - UK title)
Europa blues (2001)
De största vatten (2002); Many Waters/"Watching You" (2017 - UK title)
En midsommarnattsdröm (2003); A Midsummer Night's Dream
Dödsmässa (2004)
Mörkertal (2005)
Efterskalv (2006)
Himmelsöga (2007)

Opcop quartet
Viskleken (2011); Chinese Whispers
Hela havet stormar (2012); Musical Chairs
Blindbock (2013); Blindfold
Sista paret ut (2014); Last couple out

The fourth installment of the series came out in spring 2014.

Berger & Bloom series

Utmarker (2016); Watching you
Inland (2017); Hunted
Mittvatten (2018); You are next
Friheten (2020)
Islossning (2021)

Other books
Elva (2008); Eleven

Arne Dahl TV adaptations
The ten Intercrime novels have all been dramatised by Swedish production company Filmlance, the first five in 2011 and the rest in 2015. 
Filmlance is also responsible for the series Bron (shown in the UK as "The Bridge") and for the later Martin Beck detective programmes. Each story has been dramatised in the form of a two-part miniseries, each with two ninety minute episodes (series 1) or two one hour episodes (series two).

Series 1 (2011–2012) 
A 2011 TV adaptation of five of the Arne Dahl stories was produced by Filmlance International (in co-production with several other European companies. Outside Sweden, the series was broadcast in the UK on BBC Four between April–June 2013, along with numerous other countries. The series is currently being broadcast in the United States through MHz Networks, most recently from November 2013 to January 2014.

Series 2 (2015) 
The last five novels in the Intercrime series were adapted for Series 2 of the popular Arne Dahl TV series, produced by Filmlance. They premiered in February 2015 in Sweden. The BBC began airing the second season on BBC Four in October 2015.

Prizes and awards

2003 The Palle Rosenkrantz prize, for Europa Blues
2005 Deutscher Krimi Preis, for Upp till toppen av berget
2006 Deutscher Krimi Preis, for Europa Blues
2007 Chosen by Reader's Digest as Europe's best crime novelist
2007 The Swedish Crime Writing Award
2010 The Radio Bremen Crime Fiction Award
2010 Nominated to European Crime Fiction Star Award 2010/11
2011 Best Swedish Crime Novel Award (Bästa svenska kriminalroman) for Viskleken

References

External links
 – official website (English)

Arne Dahl mini-series films
Arne Dahl

1963 births
Living people
People from Sollentuna Municipality
Swedish crime fiction writers
Writers from Uppland